Joseph Auguste Émile Vaudremer (6 February 1829 – 7 February 1914) was a French architect. He won the prix de Rome and designed several public buildings in France, particularly in Paris, four of which have been designated monuments historiques.

Life
Entering the École nationale supérieure des beaux-arts in 1847, he apprenticed in the practice of Guillaume Abel Blouet. Winning the lauréat du premier grand of the Prix de Rome in 1854, he resided at the French Academy in Rome at the Villa Medici from 20 January 1855 to 31 December 1858.

He spent his career as a public architect with several prestigious posts, including Architect of the City of Paris, inspector-general of buildings, member of the Conseil supérieur for prisons and of the Conseil for collèges and lycées, diocesan architect for several départements, and finally teaching at the École nationale supérieure des beaux-arts, from which he also ran his own practice. Notable among his pupils were Jacques Hermant, and the Americans Louis Sullivan, Theophilus Parsons Chandler, Jr. and Arthur Rotch.

In 1867 he was elected to the seventh seat of the Académie des Beaux-Arts, architecture section, succeeding Alphonse de Gisors. He is buried in the cimetière Saint-Véran at Avignon.

Work

 1861–1867: Prison de la Santé, 13th arrondissement of Paris
 1865–1870: Saint-Pierre de Montrouge, 14th arrondissement of Paris (inscribed MH)
 1873: primary school of the Ville de Paris (present-day Collège Alberto Giacometti), 14th arrondissement of Paris
 1873: Commemorative monument of the Battle of Champigny, Champigny-sur-Marne
 1877–1879: Protestant Temple of Belleville, 97 rue Julien-Lacroix, 20th arrondissement of Paris
 1877–1892: Notre-Dame-d'Auteuil, 16th arrondissement of Paris
 1879: Episcopal Palace, Beauvais
 1882: Villa Collin, Fourqueux, for Armand Collin (a watchmaker and friend of Vaudremer's) (classed MH)
 1882–1887: boys' lycée (present-day Lycée Champollion), Grenoble
 1883–1886: girls' lycée (present-day Lycée Michelet), Montauban
 1885: Collège Guettard, Étampes
 1885–1888: boys' lycée (present-day Lycée Buffon), 15th arrondissement of Paris
 1886–1888: former girls' lycée (present-day Lycée Molière), 16th arrondissement of Paris
 1890–1895: Greek Orthodox church, 5–7 rue Bizet, 16th arrondissement of Paris, commissioned by Demetrius Stefanovich Schilizzi (inscribed MH)
 1896–1897: home for the aged (present-day Foyer Jean Bosco), 23 rue Varize, 16th arrondissement of Paris, commissioned by Schilizzi
 1897: flats, 27 avenue Georges-Mandel, 16th arrondissement of Paris (inscribed MH)
 1900–1903: Église Saint-Antoine-des-Quinze-Vingts, 12th arrondissement of Paris

Notes

Bibliography
  Alice Thomine, Émile Vaudremer (1829-1914), la rigueur de l'architecture publique, (Librairie de l'architecture et de la ville.) 382 p. Paris: Picard, 2004  (published version of the author's thesis)

External links
  Notice on Vaudremer in Répertoire des architectes diocésains on the École des chartes site

1829 births
1914 deaths
19th-century French architects
Architects from Paris
Prix de Rome for architecture
École des Beaux-Arts alumni
Members of the Académie des beaux-arts